Elías Iván Bazzi (born 23 May 1981) is an Argentine former professional footballer who played as a defender. Born in Argentina, Bazzi is of Lebanese descent.

Honours
Boca Juniors
Primera División: 2000 Apertura
Argeş Piteşti
Liga II: 2007–08
Talleres de Cordoba
Argentine Third League: 2012–13

References

External links
 
 
 

1981 births
Living people
Footballers from Córdoba, Argentina
Argentine people of Lebanese descent
Sportspeople of Lebanese descent
Argentine footballers
Association football defenders
Boca Juniors footballers
Godoy Cruz Antonio Tomba footballers
FC Progresul București players
FC Argeș Pitești players
FC Dinamo București players
FC Universitatea Cluj players
Talleres de Córdoba footballers
Gimnasia y Tiro footballers
Argentine Primera División players
Liga I players
Liga II players
Argentine expatriate footballers
Expatriate footballers in Romania
Argentine expatriate sportspeople in Romania